Franz Adolf Friedrich Schober, since 1801 von Schober (born 17 May 1796, Torup Castle at Malmö, Sweden; died 13 September 1882 in Dresden), was an Austrian poet, librettist, lithographer, actor in Breslau and Legationsrat in Weimar.

Schober was born to Austrian parents in Sweden. Educated in the Schnepfenthal Salzmann School, Akademisches Gymnasium (Vienna) and Kremsmünster Abbey, he returned to Vienna, where he began to study philosophy and met the composer Franz Schubert, his friends Johann Mayrhofer, Joseph von Spaun and the painters Leopold Kupelwieser and Moritz von Schwind. He also knew Beethoven during his later years  and their relationship culminated when he  visited him on Beethoven’s deathbed along with Schubert.
Between 1823 and 1825, Schober was an actor at the theatre in Breslau under the pseudonym "Torupson". In the 1840s, Schober was in close contact with Franz Liszt. In 1856 he married the author Thekla von Gumpert; afterwards he lived in Budapest, Munich and Dresden.

Schober wrote lyric poetry and in 1821 the libretto for Franz Schubert's opera Alfonso und Estrella and other vocal pieces.

Publications 
 Gedichte (1842) 
 Gedichte (1865)

References 
 Constant von Wurzbach: Schober, Franz von. In: Biographisches Lexikon des Kaiserthums Oesterreich. Band 31, 62–65. (onlineversion) – with wrong year of birth
 Mária Eckhardt: Franz von Schober. Schuberts und Liszts Dichterfreund, in: Schubert durch die Brille 18. Hans Schneider, Tutzing 1997, 69–79.
 Mária Eckhardt: Schubert's and Liszt's friend and poet: Franz von Schober. in: Liszt Saeculum 1, Budapest 1996, Nr. 56, 13 – 19.
 Ilija Dürhammer: "Affectionen einer lebhaft begehrenden Sinnlichkeit". Der "Schobert"-Kreis zwischen "neuer Schule" und Weltschmerz, in: Walther Dürr, S. Schmalzriedt, Th. Seyboldt (ed.): Schuberts Lieder nach Gedichten aus seinem literarischen Freundeskreis. Auf der Suche nach dem Ton der Dichtung in der Musik. Kongreßbericht Ettlingen 1997. Frankfurt a. M. 1999, 39–58.
 Siegfried Schmalzriedt: "Meiner Seele Saiten streift". Franz von Schobers Lyrik in Franz Schuberts Vertonungen, In: Walther Dürr, S. Schmalzriedt, Th. Seyboldt (Hg.): Schuberts Lieder nach Gedichten aus seinem literarischen Freundeskreis. Auf der Suche nach dem Ton der Dichtung in der Musik. Kongreßbericht Ettlingen 1997. Frankfurt a. M. 1999, 59–80.
 Ilija Dürhammer: Schuberts literarische Heimat. Dichtung und Literatur-Rezeption der Schubert-Freunde, Wien-Köln-Weimar 1999.
 Michael Kohlhäufl: Poetisches Vaterland. Dichtung und politisches Denken im Freundeskreis Franz Schuberts, Kassel 1999.
 Rita Steblin: The Schober family's "tiefe sittliche Verdorbenheit" as revealed in spy reports from 1810 about Ludovica and her mother, in: Schubert durch die Brille 29. Hans Schneider, Tutzing 2002, 39–65.
 Michael Lorenz: Die Familie Schober und ihr genealogisches Umfeld, in: Schubert durch die Brille 30. Hans Schneider, Tutzing 2003. (Family tree online)
 Till Gerrit Waidelich: „Torupson“ und Franz von Schober – Leben und Wirken des von Frauen, Freunden und Biographen umworbenen Schubert- und Schwind-Freundes, in: Schubert:Perspektiven 6 (2006), Heft 1 und 2 - Sonderheft, S. 1–237. ISSN 1617-6340. Content and Index in: Schubert:Perspektiven 7 (2007), 107–120.
 Rita Steblin: Schober’s Love Affair with Marie von Spaun and the Role Played by Helene Schmith, the Wife of Mozart’s First Violinist, in: Schubert:Perspektiven 8 (2008), 48–86.

Notes

See also
 List of compositions by Franz Schubert

External links 
 
 Literaturliste im Online-Katalog der Staatsbibliothek zu Berlin
 
 Texts set to music at the LiederNet Archive
 

1796 births
1882 deaths
Austrian male writers
Austrian untitled nobility
Austrian expatriates in Sweden
Austrian expatriates in Germany
Austrian expatriates in Hungary
Writers from Malmö
Writers from Vienna
Franz Schubert
German male writers